State Route 61, also known as SR 61, is a  state highway in northern Arizona running generally southwest to northeast, from its southern terminus at U.S. Route 60 (US 60) east of Show Low to the New Mexico border at Zuni, where it becomes New Mexico State Road 53.  Parts of this route, particularly near St. Johns, overlap US 180 and US 191.

Route description

The southern terminus of SR 61 is located at a junction with US 60 east of Show Low. From here, the highway heads towards the northeast towards an intersection with SR 180A. After this intersection, SR 61 begins to follow a more easterly heading to a junction with US 180. SR 61 runs concurrently with US 180 from this intersection eastward to an intersection with US 191 in St. Johns. While US 180 continues to the south concurrent with US 191, SR 61 begins to run concurrently with US 191 to the north. The two split north of St. Johns with US 191 continuing to head north and SR 61 heads off towards the northeast. SR 61 reaches its northern terminus at the New Mexico border while the highway itself continues into New Mexico as New Mexico State Road 53.

Junction list

References

External links

 SR 61 - Arizona Roads

061
Transportation in Apache County, Arizona